The following is a partial list of currently operating state schools in the unitary council areas of Aberdeenshire, Angus, Argyll and Bute, Clackmannanshire and Dumfries and Galloway in Scotland, United Kingdom. You may also find :Category:Schools in Scotland of use to find a particular school. See also the List of the oldest schools in the United Kingdom.

By unitary council area.

Note that the allocations to address and council area may not be accurate in every case and you can help if you have access to local directories.

Aberdeenshire

Nursery schools
Ballogie Nursery, Aboyne
Crossroads Nursery, Durris, Banchory

Primary schools
Aberchirder Primary School, Aberchirder
Aboyne Primary School, Aboyne
Alehousewells Primary School, Kemnay
Alford Primary School, Alford
Arduthie Primary School, Stonehaven
Arnage Primary School, Ellon
Auchenblae Primary School, Auchenblae
Auchnagatt Primary School, Auchnagatt
Auchterellon Primary School, Ellon
Auchterless Primary School, Auchterless
Ballater Primary School, Ballater
Balmedie Primary School, Balmedie
Banchory Primary School, Banchory
Banchory-Devenick Primary School, Banchory-Devenick
Banff Primary School, Banff
Barthol Chapel Primary School, Barthol Chapel
Bervie Primary School, Inverbervie
Boddam Primary School, Boddam
Bracoden Primary School, Gardenstown
Braemar Primary School, Braemar
Buchanhaven Primary School, Peterhead
Burnhaven Primary School, Peterhead
Cairney Primary School, Cairnie
Catterline Primary School, Catterline
Chapel of Garioch Primary School, Pitcaple
Clatt Primary School, Clatt
Clerkhill Primary School, Peterhead
Cluny Primary School, Sauchen
Craigievar Primary School, Alford
Crathes Primary School, Banchory
Crathie Primary School, Crathie
Crimond Primary School, Crimond
Crombie Primary School, Westhill
Crudie Primary School, Turriff
Cultercullen Primary School, Udny Station
Dales Park Primary School, Peterhead
Daviot Primary School, Daviot
Drumblade Primary School, Drumblade
Drumoak Primary School, Drumoak
Dunecht Primary School, Dunecht
Dunnottar Primary School, Stonehaven
Durris Primary School, Kirkton of Durris
Easterfield Primary School, Turriff
Echt Primary School, Echt
Ellon Primary School, Ellon
Elrick Primary School, Elrick
Fetterangus Primary School, Fetterangus
Fettercairn Primary School, Fettercairn
Fintry Primary School, Turriff
Finzean Primary School, Finzean
Fisherford Primary School, Rothienorman
Fishermoss Primary School, Portlethen
Fordyce Primary School, Fordyce
Forgue Primary School, Forgue
Foveran Primary School, Foveran
Fraserburgh North Primary School, Fraserburgh
Fraserburgh South Park Primary School, Fraserburgh
Fyvie Primary School, Fyvie
Gartly Primary School, Gartly
Glass Primary School, Glass
Glenbervie Primary School, Glenbervie
Gordon Primary School, Huntly
Gourdon Primary School, Gourdon
Hatton (Cruden) Primary School, Hatton
Hatton (Fintray) Primary School, Hatton of Fintray
Hill of Banchory Primary School, Banchory
Hillside Primary School, Portlethen
Insch Primary School, Insch
Inverallochy Primary School, Inverallochy
Johnshaven Primary School, Johnshaven
Keig Primary School, Keig
Keithhall Primary School, Kinmuck
Kellands Primary School, Inverurie
Kemnay Primary School, Kemnay
Kennethmont Primary School, Kennethmont
Kincardine O'Neil Primary School, Kincardine O'Neil
Kinellar Primary School, Blackburn
King Edward Primary School, King Edward
Kininmonth Primary School, New Leeds
Kinneff Primary School, Kinneff
Kintore Primary School, Kintore
Lairhillock Primary School, Netherley
Largue Primary School, Forgue
Laurencekirk Primary School, Laurencekirk
Lochpots Primary School, Fraserburgh
Logie Coldstone Primary School, Logie Coldstone
Logie Durno Primary School, Pitcaple
Longside Primary School, Longside
Lumphanan Primary School, Lumphanan
Lumsden Primary School, Lumsden
Luthermuir Primary School, Laurencekirk
Macduff Primary School, Macduff
Marykirk Primary School, Marykirk
Maud Primary School, Maud
Meethill Primary School, Peterhead
Meiklemill Primary School, Ellon
Meldrum Primary School, Oldmeldrum
Methlick Primary School, Methlick
Midmar Primary School, Inverurie
Midmill Primary School, Kintore
Mill O' Forest Primary School, Stonehaven
Mintlaw Primary School, Mintlaw
Monquhitter Primary School, Cuminestown
Monymusk Primary School, Monymusk
New Deer Primary School, New Deer
New Machar Primary School, Newmachar
New Pitsligo & St John's Primary School, New Pitsligo
Newburgh Mathers Primary School, Newburgh
Newtonhill Primary School, Newtonhill
Old Rayne Primary School, Old Rayne
Ordiquhill Primary School, Cornhill
Oyne Primary School, Oyne
Peterhead Central Primary School, Peterhead
Pitfour Primary School, Mintlaw
Pitmedden Primary School, Pitmedden
Port Elphinstone Primary School, Inverurie
Port Errol Primary School, Cruden Bay
Portlethen Primary School, Portlethen
Portsoy Primary School, Portsoy
Premnay Primary School, Auchleven
Rathen Primary School, Rathen
Rayne North Primary School, Old Rayne
Redmyre Primary School, Fordoun
Rhynie Primary School, Rhynie
Rosehearty Primary School, Rosehearty
Rothienorman Primary School, Rothienorman
Sandhaven Primary School, Sandhaven
Skene Primary School, Skene
Slains Primary School, Collieston
St Andrew's Primary School, Fraserburgh
St Combs Primary School, St Combs
St Cyrus Primary School, St Cyrus
St Fergus Primary School, St Fergus
Strathburn Primary School, Inverurie
Strathdon Primary School, Strathdon
Strichen Primary School, Strichen
Stuartfield Primary School, Stuartfield
Tarland Primary School, Tarland
Tarves Primary School, Tarves
Tipperty Primary School, Ellon
Torphins Primary School, Torphins
Tough Primary School, Kirkton of Tough
Towie Primary School, Towie
Tullynessle Primary School, Tullynessle
Turriff Primary School, Turriff
Tyrie Primary School, Tyrie
Udny Green Primary School, Udny Green
Uryside Primary School, Inverurie
Westhill Primary School, Westhill
Whitehills Primary School, Whitehills

Secondary schools
Aboyne Academy, Aboyne
Alford Academy, Alford
Banchory Academy, Banchory
Banff Academy, Banff
Ellon Academy, Ellon
Fraserburgh Academy, Fraserburgh
The Gordon Schools, Huntly
Inverurie Academy, Inverurie
Kemnay Academy, Kemnay
Mackie Academy, Stonehaven
Mearns Academy, Laurencekirk
Meldrum Academy, Oldmeldrum
Mintlaw Academy, Mintlaw
Peterhead Academy, Peterhead
Portlethen Academy, Portlethen
Turriff Academy, Turriff
Westhill Academy, Westhill

Special schools
Anna Ritchie School, Peterhead
Carronhill School, Stonehaven
St Andrew's School, Inverurie
Westfield School, Fraserburgh

Angus

Primary schools
Aberlemno Primary School, Forfar
Airlie Primary School, Kirriemuir
Andover Primary School, Brechin
Arbirlot Primary School, Arbroath
Auchterhouse Primary School, Auchterhouse
Birkhill Primary School, Birkhill
Borrowfield Primary School, Montrose
Burnside Primary School, Carnoustie
Carlogie Primary School, Carnoustie
Carmyllie Primary School, Arbroath
Colliston Primary School, Arbroath
Cortachy Primary School, Kirriemuir
Eassie Primary School, Forfar
Edzell Primary School, Brechin
Ferryden Primary School, Montrose
Friockheim Primary School, Arbroath
Glamis Primary School, Forfar
Grange Primary School, Monifieth
Hayshead Primary School, Arbroath
Inverarity Primary School, Forfar
Inverbrothock Primary School, Arbroath
Inverkeilor Primary School, Arbroath
Isla Primary School, Kirriemuir
Ladyloan Primary School, Arbroath
Langlands Primary School, Forfar
Letham Primary School, Forfar
Liff Primary School, Liff
Lochside Primary School, Montrose
Maisondieu Primary School, Brechin
Mattocks Primary School, Wellbank
Monikie Primary School, Monikie
Muirfield Primary School, Arbroath
Murroes Primary School, Murroes
Newbigging Primary School, Monifieth
Newtyle Primary School, Newtyle
Northmuir Primary School, Kirriemuir
Rosemount Primary School, Montrose
Seaview Primary School, Monifieth
Southesk Primary School, Montrose
Southmuir Primary School, Kirriemuir
St. Margaret's Primary School, Montrose
St. Thomas' Primary School, Arbroath
Stracathro Primary School, Brechin
Strathmartine Primary School, Strathmartine
Strathmore Primary School, Forfar
Tannadice Primary School, Forfar
Tealing Primary School, Tealing
Timmergreens Primary School, Arbroath
Warddykes Primary School, Arbroath
Whitehills Primary School, Forfar
Woodlands Primary School, Carnoustie

Secondary schools

Arbroath Academy, Arbroath
Arbroath High School, Arbroath
Brechin High School, Brechin
Carnoustie High School, Carnoustie
Forfar Academy. Forfar
Monifieth High School, Monifieth
Montrose Academy, Montrose
Webster's High School, Kirriemuir

Argyll and Bute

Primary schools
Achahoish Primary School, Achahoish
Achaleven Primary School, Connel
Ardrishaig Primary School, Ardrishaig
Arinagour Primary School, Coll
Arrochar Primary School, Tarbet
Barcaldine Primary School, Connel
Bowmore Primary School, Islay
Bunessan Primary School, Isle of Mull
Cardross Primary School, Cardross
Carradale Primary School, Carradale
Castlehill Primary School, Campbeltown
Clachan Primary School, Clachan, by Tarbert
Colgrain Primary School, Helensburgh
Craignish Primary School, Ardfern
Dalintober Primary School, Campbeltown
Dalmally Primary School, Dalmally
Dervaig Primary School, Isle of Mull
Drumlemble Primary School, Drumlemble
Dunbeg Primary School, Dunbeg
Dunoon Primary School, Dunoon
Easdale Primary School, Seil by Oban
Furnace Primary School, Furnace by Inveraray
Garelochhead Primary School, Garelochhead
Gigha Primary School, Isle of Gigha
Glassary Primary School, Lochgilphead
Glenbarr Primary School, Tarbert
Hermitage Primary School, Helensburgh
Innellan Primary School, Innellan
Inveraray Primary School, Inveraray
Iona Primary School, Iona
John Logie Baird Primary School, Helensburgh
Keills Primary School, Islay
Kilchattan Primary School, Colonsay
Kilchrenan Primary School, Taynuilt
Kilcreggan Primary School, Helensburgh
Kilmartin Primary School, Lochgilphead
Kilmodan Primary School, Glendaruel
Kilninver Primary School, by Oban
Kirn Primary School, Dunoon
Lismore Primary School, Lismore
Lochdonhead Primary School, Isle of Mull
Lochgilphead Joint Campus, Lochgilphead
Lochgoilhead Primary School, Lochgoilhead 
Lochnell Primary School, Connel
Luing Primary School, Luing
Luss Primary School, by Alexandria
Minard Primary School, Minard
North Bute Primary School, Port Bannatyne, Isle of Bute
Park Primary School, Oban
Port Charlotte Primary School, Port Charlotte, Islay
Port Ellen Primary School, Port Ellen, Islay
Rhu Primary School, Rhu, by Helensburgh
Rhunahaorine Primary School, Tayinloan
Rockfield Primary School, Oban
Rosneath Primary School, Helensburgh
Rothesay Joint Campus, Isle of Bute
Salen Primary School, Isle of Mull
Sandbank Primary School, Dunoon
Small Isles Primary School, Craighouse, Jura
Southend Primary School, Campbeltown
St. Andrew's Primary School, Rothesay, Isle of Bute
St. Columba's Primary School, Oban
St. Joseph's Primary School, Helensburgh
St. Mun's Primary School, Dunoon
Strachur Primary School, Strachur
Strath of Appin Primary School, Appin
Strone Primary School, Strone, by Dunoon
Tarbert Academy, Tarbert
Taynuilt Primary School, Taynuilt
Tayvallich Primary School, Tayvallich
Tighnabruaich Primary School, Tighnabruaich
Tiree High School, Tiree
Tobermory High School, Tobermory
Toward Primary School, Toward, Dunoon
Ulva Primary School, Ulva Ferry, Isle of Mull

Secondary schools
Campbeltown Grammar School, Campbeltown
Dunoon Grammar School, Dunoon
Hermitage Academy, Helensburgh
Islay High School, Bowmore, Islay
Lochgilphead Joint Campus, Lochgilphead
Oban High School, Oban
Rothesay Academy, Rothesay, Isle of Bute
Tarbert Academy, Tarbert
Tiree High School, Tiree
Tobermory High School, Tobermory

Special schools
Drummore Learning Centre, Oban
Parklands Special School, Helensburgh

Clackmannanshire

Nursery schools
Sauchie ELC Centre, Sauchie
Tulach ELC Centre, Tullibody

Primary schools
Abercromby Primary School, Tullibody
Alva Primary School, Alva
Banchory Primary School, Tullibody
Clackmannan Primary School, Clackmannan
Coalsnaughton Primary School, Coalsnaughton
Craigbank Primary School, Sauchie
Deerpark Primary School, Sauchie
Fishcross Primary School, Fishcross
Menstrie Primary School, Menstrie
Muckhart Primary School, Muckhart
Park Primary School, Alloa
Redwell Primary School, Alloa
St. Bernadette's R.C. Primary School, Tullibody
St. Mungo's R.C. Primary School, Alloa
St. Serf's Primary School, Tullibody
Strathdevon Primary School, Dollar
Sunnyside Primary School, Alloa
Tillicoultry Primary School, Tillicoultry

Secondary schools
Alloa Academy, Alloa
Alva Academy, Alva
Lornshill Academy, Alloa

Special schools
Lochies School, Sauchie

Dumfries and Galloway

Primary schools
Ae Primary School, Dumfries
Amisfield Primary School, Dumfries
Applegarth Primary School, Lockerbie
Auchencairn Primary School, Castle Douglas
Beattock Primary School, Moffat
Belmont Primary School, Stranraer
Borgue Primary School, Kirkcudbright
Brownhall Primary School, Dumfries
Brydekirk Primary School, Annan
Caerlaverock Primary School, Dumfries
Calside Primary School, Dumfries
Canonbie Primary School, Canonbie
Cargenbridge Primary School, Dumfries
Carrutherstown Primary School, Dumfries
Carsphairn Primary School, Carsphairn
Castle Douglas Primary School, Castle Douglas
Castle Kennedy Primary School, Castle Kennedy
Closeburn Primary School, Thornhill
Collin Primary School, Dumfries
Colvend Primary School, Dalbeattie
Creetown Primary School, Creetown
Crossmichael Primary School, Castle Douglas
Cummertrees Primary School, Annan
Dalbeattie Primary School, Dalbeattie
Dalry Primary School, Castle Douglas
Drummore Primary School, Stranraer
Duncow Primary School, Dumfries
Dunscore Primary School, Dumfries
Eaglesfield Primary School, Lockerbie
Eastriggs Primary School, Eastriggs
Elmvale Primary School, Annan
Garlieston Primary School, Garlieston
Gatehouse Primary School, Gatehouse of Fleet
Gelston Primary School, Castle Douglas
Georgetown Primary School, Dumfries
Glenluce Primary School, Glenluce
Gretna Primary School, Gretna
Hardgate Primary School, Castle Douglas
Heathhall Primary School, Dumfries
Hecklegirth Primary School, Annan
Hightae Primary School, Lockerbie
Hoddom Primary School, Ecclefechan
Holywood Primary School, Dumfries
Hottsbridge Primary School, Lockerbie
Hutton Primary School, Lockerbie
Johnstonebridge Primary School, Lockerbie
Kelloholm Primary School, Sanquhar
Kells Primary School, New Galloway
Kirkbean Primary School, Dumfries
Kirkcolm Primary School, Kirkcolm
Kirkcowan Primary School, Kirkcowan
Kirkcudbright Primary School, Kirkcudbright
Kirkgunzeon Primary School, Dumfries
Kirkinner Primary School, Kirkinner
Kirkpatrick Fleming Primary School, Lockerbie
Langholm Primary School, Langholm
Laurieknowe Primary School, Dumfries
Leswalt Primary School, Stranraer
Lincluden Primary School, Dumfries
Locharbriggs Primary School, Dumfries
Lochmaben Primary School, Lockerbie
Lochrutton Primary School, Dumfries
Lockerbie Primary School, Lockerbie
Loreburn Primary School, Dumfries
Minigaff Primary School, Newton Stewart
Moffat Primary School, Moffat
Moniaive Primary School, Moniaive
Nethermill Primary School, Dumfries
New Abbey Primary School, Dumfries
Newington Primary School, Annan
Noblehill Primary School, Dumfries
North West Community Campus, Dumfries
Palnackie Primary School, Castle Douglas
Park Primary School, Stranraer
Penninghame Primary School, Newton Stewart
Penpont Primary School, Thornhill
Portpatrick Primary School, Portpatrick
Port William Primary School, Port William
Rephad Primary School, Stranraer
Sandhead Primary School, Stranraer
Sanquhar Primary School, Sanquhar
Shawhead Primary School, Dumfries
Sheuchan Primary School, Stranraer
Springfield Primary School, Gretna
Springholm Primary School, Castle Douglas
St. Andrew's R.C. Primary School, Dumfries
St. Columba's R.C. Primary School, Annan
St. Joseph's R.C. Primary School, Stranraer
St. Michael's Primary School, Dumfries
St. Mungo Primary School, Lockerbie
St. Ninian's R.C. Primary School, Newton Stewart
St. Teresa's R.C. Primary School, Dumfries
Troqueer Primary School, Dumfries
Tundergarth Primary School, Lockerbie
Twynholm Primary School, Kirkcudbright
Wallace Hall Primary School, Thornhill
Whithorn Primary School, Whithorn
Wigtown Primary School, Wigtown

Secondary schools
Annan Academy
Castle Douglas High School
Dalbeattie High School
Dalry Secondary School, St John's Town of Dalry
Douglas Ewart High School, Newton Stewart
Dumfries Academy
Dumfries High School
Kirkcudbright Academy
Langholm Academy
Lockerbie Academy
Moffat Academy
North West Community Campus, Dumfries
St Joseph's College
Sanquhar Academy
Stranraer Academy
Wallace Hall Academy, Thornhill

Other schools in Scotland
List of independent schools in Scotland
List of state schools in Scotland (city council areas)
List of state schools in Scotland (council areas excluding cities, E–H)
List of state schools in Scotland (council areas excluding cities, I–R)
List of state schools in Scotland (council areas excluding cities, S–W)

See also
List of schools in the United Kingdom
Education in the United Kingdom
Education in Scotland
Education Scotland

References

External links
 The website Friends Reunited has a large index of schools but it is not possible to readily distinguish as to which schools are currently operating or closed.
 The website UK Schools & Colleges Database lists currently operating state (and some independent) schools by Local Education Authority and also links to websites of individual schools where available.

A-D
State schools
Schools in Scotland by council area